First Nations Bank of Canada (FNBC) is the first Canadian chartered bank to be independently controlled by Indigenous shareholders.  FNBC is a Schedule 1 Federally Regulated Bank in accordance with the Bank Act and received its charter on 19 November 1996. The bank headquarters are located in Saskatoon, Saskatchewan, Canada.

As of 2014, Indigenous Canadian groups own 80 percent of the bank.

History
It began as a venture initiated by First Nations in Saskatchewan and was established in 1996 as a strategic alliance of the Saskatchewan Indian Equity Foundation, the Federation of Saskatchewan Indian Nations, now the Federation of Sovereign Indigenous Nations (a First Nations organisation), and TD Bank. The first branch opened in Saskatoon. A ceremony was held in Toronto in 1996 to celebrate the bank's launch.
 
The bank focuses on commercial customers in markets dominated by Indigenous peoples, including Indigenous businesses, Indigenous governments and organizations, and non-Indigenous businesses serving Indigenous markets.

The bank also has a growing volume of personal loans and mortgages primarily focused in its growing branch network of nine full service branches and eight community banking centres in markets with significant numbers of Indigenous peoples.

At the end of 2009, the First Nations Bank had lent $160.2 million, with assets totalling $266.5 million. The profit increased from 2008 to 2009 from 8,000 to 157,000 dollars. In 2010, the bank reported an income of $10.2 million.

The bank officially de-coupled from TD Bank in 2012. The two banks had entered into a seven-year partnership starting in 2007.

The bank is majority owned by 78 Indigenous shareholders that hold, in aggregate, over 80% ownership interest in the shares of the bank.

Services
FNBC offers services focused on Indigenous and non-Indigenous  customers:
Deposit accounts
Investments
Commercial Loans
Mortgages
Micro Loans
Cash Management
Credit Products
ABM access

Operations
Corporate Offices:
Saskatoon, Saskatchewan - Head Office

FNBC Branches:
Saskatoon, Saskatchewan (1997)
Cree Nation of Chisasibi, Quebec (1998)
Walpole Island First Nation, Ontario (1999)
Winnipeg, Manitoba (2003)
Whitehorse, Yukon (2007)
Meadow Lake, Saskatchewan (2008)
Iqaluit, Nunavut (2010)
Yellowknife, Northwest Territories (2014)
Enoch Cree Nation, Alberta (2019)

Community Banking Centres:
Buffalo River Dene Nation, Saskatchewan (2000)
Cree Nation of Nemaska, Quebec (2003)
Baker Lake, Nunavut (2014)
Pond Inlet, Nunavut (2014)
Kugluktuk, Nunavut (2015)
Pangnirtung, Nunavut (2018)
Arviat, Nunavut (2019)
Whapmagoostui, Quebec (2019)

Membership
FNBC is a member of the Canadian Bankers Association (CBA) and registered member with the Canada Deposit Insurance Corporation (CDIC), a federal agency insuring deposits at all of Canada's chartered banks. It is also a member of:

Interac
VISA International
Canada Mortgage and Housing Corporation
Canada Deposit Insurance Corporation
Payments Canada
THE EXCHANGE Network

References

External links
First Nations Bank of Canada

Banks of Canada
First Nations in Saskatchewan
Financial services companies based in Saskatchewan
First Nations organizations
Companies based in Saskatoon
1996 establishments in Saskatchewan
Banks established in 1996